Saint-Ange Vebobe (6 July 1953 – 4 September 2022) was a French basketball player who played as a small forward.

Biography
Vebobe played for the France national team from 1973 to 1985, playing in 76 games. He was the father of Luc-Arthur Vebobe.

References

1953 births
2022 deaths
French men's basketball players
French people of Martiniquais descent
France national basketball team players
ASVEL Basket players
Olympique Antibes basketball players
Caen Basket Calvados players
JA Vichy players